Sport-Club Freiburg e.V., commonly known as SC Freiburg or just Freiburg, is a German football club, based in the city of Freiburg im Breisgau, Baden-Württemberg. It plays in the Bundesliga, having been promoted as champions from the 2. Bundesliga in 2016. Between 1954 and 2021, Freiburg's stadium was the Dreisamstadion. The club moved to the newly built Europa-Park Stadion in 2021. Volker Finke, who was the club's manager between 1991 and 2007, was the longest-serving manager in the history of professional football in Germany. Joachim Löw, former manager of the Germany national team, is the club's second-highest all-time leading goal scorer with 81 goals in 252 games during his three spells at the club, behind Nils Petersen.

History
The club traces its origins to a pair of clubs founded in 1904: Freiburger Fußballverein 04 was organised in March of that year; FC Schwalbe Freiburg just two months later. Both clubs underwent name changes, with Schwalbe becoming FC Mars in 1905, Mars becoming Union Freiburg in 1906, and FV 04 Freiburg becoming Sportverein Freiburg 04 in 1909. Three years later, SV and Union formed Sportclub Freiburg, at the same time incorporating the griffin head.

In 1918, after the devastation of World War I, SC Freiburg entered a temporary arrangement with Freiburger FC to be able to field a full side called KSG Freiburg. The next year, SC Freiburg associated themselves with FT 1844 Freiburg as that club's football department, until 1928 when they left to enter into a stadium-sharing arrangement with PSV (Polizeisportvereins) Freiburg 1924 that lasted until 1930 and the failure of PSV. SC Freiburg then picked up again with FT 1844 Freiburg in 1938. The club played on the highest level from 1928, first in the Bezirksliga Baden, then in the Gauliga Baden, from which they were relegated in 1934.

At the end of World War II, Allied occupation authorities disbanded most existing organizations in Germany, including football and sports clubs. The clubs were permitted to reconstitute themselves after about a year, but were required to take on new names in an attempt to disassociate them from the so-recent Nazi past. SC Freiburg was therefore briefly known as VfL Freiburg. By 1950, French-occupation authorities had let up enough to allow the clubs to reclaim their old identities. Finally, in 1952, SC Freiburg left FT Freiburg behind again.

To this point, the history of the club had been characterised by only modest success. Through the 1930s, SC Freiburg played in the Bezirkliga (II), with the occasional turn in the Gauliga Baden (I), and captured a handful of local titles. After World War II, they picked up where they left off, playing in the Amateurliga Südbaden (III).

Although only a small club, SC Freiburg became known for the fight and team spirit in their play. This led them to the 2. Bundesliga in 1978–79, which they would compete in for a decade-and-a-half before making the breakthrough to the top-flight Bundesliga in 1993–94 under the management of Volker Finke. In their first Bundesliga season, Freiburg narrowly avoided relegation. They made an exciting run in their second season at the top level, finishing third, just three points behind champions Borussia Dortmund. It was at this time that they were first nicknamed Breisgau-Brasilianer (literally Breisgau-Brazilians) due to their attractive style of play.

The club's greatest success was reaching the UEFA Cup in 1995 and 2001.

Freiburg's first Bundesliga relegation was in 1997 after they finished in 17th position. While they have been relegated four times since first making the Bundesliga, they have thrice won immediate promotion back to the top league, only failing to do so in 2005–06. It was the first time since 1992 that Freiburg played in the 2. Bundesliga for two consecutive seasons.

Freiburg finished the 2006–07 season in fourth place in the 2. Bundesliga, missing out on the third automatic-promotion spot on goal difference to MSV Duisburg, although they won 12 of their last 16 league games. They were knocked out of the DFB-Pokal in the second round by VfL Wolfsburg on 24 October 2006.

On 20 May 2007, Volker Finke resigned as the club's coach after 16 years in the job. He was succeeded by Robin Dutt, who himself left the club for Bayer Leverkusen in 2011.

On 10 May 2009, Freiburg secured promotion into the Bundesliga once again, beating TuS Koblenz in an away game 5–2. In the 2011–12 season, Freiburg appeared to be unable to avoid another relegation for the most part of the season but a coaching change turned the sides fortunes around and the club eventually finished 12th and survived.

Under Christian Streich, the 2012–13 Bundesliga season saw the club finish in fifth place, their best league standing since 1994–95. The fifth-place finish secured a position in the 2013–14 UEFA Europa League, an accomplishment that the club had not achieved since the 2001–02 edition of the tournament. Had Freiburg defeated Schalke 04 on the final matchday of the season, Freiburg would have leapfrogged Schalke and qualified for the UEFA Champions League for the first time in club history. The 1–2 defeat to Schalke, however, saw Schalke secure fourth place in the league and qualify for the tournament instead. During the 2012–13 season, Freiburg also advanced to the semi-finals of the DFB-Pokal for the first time in the club's history but lost to local rivals VfB Stuttgart 1–2 and missed the chance to play Bayern Munich in the final.

In the 2014–15 season, after six years in the top flight, Freiburg was relegated to the 2. Bundesliga by a single point after a final-day defeat at Hannover 96. This was despite beating Bayern Munich in the second-last game. In the following season, however, the club earned its fifth promotion to the Bundesliga as league champions, with two matches to spare. The first season back in the Bundesliga saw them end seventh. This saw Freiburg qualify for the Europa League, as German cupwinners Borussia Dortmund were already qualified for the Champions League. The side were eliminated in the third qualification round against NK Domžale from Slovenia. Mostly thanks to 15 league goals by Nils Petersen, Freiburg stayed in the top flight, finishing 15th.

In April 2022, the team announced their sponsorship with car retailer Cazoo starting in July 2022. The Cazoo brand is visible on the front of the new jerseys as the team's main sponsor. In addition to the Bundesliga professionals, Cazoo will appear as shirt sponsor and advertising partner of the second team of SC Freiburg in the third division and as co-sponsor of the Freiburg Football School, and will be visible at all matches of the SC junior teams. Cazoo will also be a co-sponsor and sleeve sponsor of SC Freiburg's Bundesliga women.

Reserve team

The club's reserve team, formerly the SC Freiburg Amateure, now SC Freiburg II, has, for the most part of its history played in the lower amateur leagues. It made a three-season appearance in the tier four Verbandsliga Südbaden from 1983 to 1986, but then took until 1994 to return to this league. In 1998 the team won promotion to the Oberliga Baden-Württemberg after a league championship in the Verbandsliga. Freiburg II spent the next ten seasons at this level as an upper table side before another league championship took the team to the Regionalliga Süd. After four seasons at this league the team became part of the new Regionalliga Südwest in 2012. After a seventh place in its first season in the league the team finished runner-up in 2013–14.

A South Baden Cup win in 2001 qualified it for the first round of the 2001–02 DFB-Pokal, the German Cup, where it lost to Schalke 04.

Stadium

SC Freiburg formerly played its home games at the Dreisamstadion, named after the Dreisam River which flows through Freiburg. Because of sponsorship agreements, the stadium was known as the Schwarzwald-Stadion. The stadium has an approximate capacity of 24,000 spectators and was built in 1953. Forty years later, then manager Volker Finke began an initiative to transform the Dreisamstadion into Germany's first solar powered football stadium. There are solar modules on the north, south, and main tribunes. These panels generate 250,000 kWh of energy per year.

The brand new Europa-Park Stadion designed by HPP Architekten, was completed in October 2021. Located in the west of the city in a part of the city called Brühl — immediately to the west of Freiburg Airport — it has a capacity of 34,700.

In Europe

Matches

Overall record

Club records in UEFA competitions

Biggest win in UEFA competition: 13 October 2022, Nantes 0–4 Freiburg, at Nantes
Biggest defeat in UEFA competition: 3 October 2013, Sevilla 2–0 Freiburg at Seville, 12 December 2013, Freiburg 0–2 Sevilla at Freiburg, Freiburg 0–2 Juventus at Freiburg
Club appearances in UEFA Europa League: 5
Player with most UEFA appearances: Andreas Zeyer – 8 appearances
Top scorer in UEFA club competitions: Sebastian Kehl – 2 goals

Club records
Statistics correct as of 1 January 2023.
 Most 1. Bundesliga goals scored: 68 – Nils Petersen 6 August 2022
Highest transfer fee paid: €10 million for Baptiste Santamaria
Highest transfer fee received: €21.1 million for Çağlar Söyüncü
Youngest goalscorer:  Matthias Ginter – 18 years, 2 days
 Player who has scored the most against club: Claudio Pizarro – 14 goals in 17 matches
Biggest home win: 6–0 – against Rot-Weiß Erfurt on 24 August 1991
Biggest 1. Bundesliga home win: 5–0 – against Hansa Rostock on 17 September 1999 and against VfL Bochum on 9 December 2000
Biggest away win: 6–0 – against Borussia Mönchengladbach on 5 December 2021
Biggest 1. Bundesliga away win: 6–0 – against Borussia Mönchengladbach on 5 December 2021
Biggest home loss: 0–6 – against Bayern Munich on 16 December 2003 and against Werder Bremen on 4 December 2004 and 21 November 2009
Biggest 1. Bundesliga home loss: 0–6 – against Bayern Munich on 16 December 2003 and against Werder Bremen on 4 December 2004 and 21 November 2009
Biggest away loss: 0–7 – against Bayern Munich on 10 September 2011
Biggest 1. Bundesliga away loss: 0–7 – against Bayern Munich on 10 September 2011

Most appearances
Players marked in bold are still playing for the club.

Top goalscorers
Players marked in bold are still playing for the club.

Honours

League
2. Bundesliga (II)
 Winners: 1992–93, 2002–03, 2008–09, 2015–16
Regionalliga Südwest (IV)
 Winners: 2020-21‡
Oberliga Baden-Württemberg (V)
 Winners: 2008‡, 2017‡
Amateurliga Südbaden (III)
 Winners: 1965, 1968, 1978
Verbandsliga Südbaden (V)
 Winners: 1998‡

Cup
South Baden Cup (Tiers III-VII)
 Winners: 1975, 1978, 2001‡
 Runners-up: 2005‡ 

DFB-Pokal 
 Runners-up: 2021–22

Youth
League
 German Under 19 championship Winners: 2008
 Under 19 Bundesliga South/Southwest Winners: 2005–06, 2008–09

Cup
 German Under-19 CupWinners: 2006, 2009, 2011, 2012, 2018

Under-21 International
 Lev Yashin Cup'Winners: 2011

‡ Won by reserve team.

Players

Current squad

Out on loan

Selected notable former players

This list of former players includes those who received international caps while playing for the team, made significant contributions to the team in terms of appearances or goals while playing for the team, or who made significant contributions to the sport either before they played for the team, or after they left. It is not complete or all inclusive, and additions and refinements will continue to be made over time.

 Altin Rraklli
 Rodolfo Esteban Cardoso
 Andreas Ibertsberger
 Zlatan Bajramović
 Mohammadou Idrissou
 Rolf-Christel Guié-Mien
 Austin Berry
 Damir Burić
 Nikola Jurčević
 Michael Lumb
 Alexander Iashvili
 Levan Kobiashvili
 Dennis Aogo
 Martin Braun
 Michael Frontzeck
 Richard Golz
 Jörg Heinrich
 Andreas Hinkel
 Sebastian Kehl
 Ralf Kohl
 Joachim Löw
 Stefan Müller
 Sascha Riether
 Jörg Schmadtke
 Karl-Heinz Schulz
 Martin Spanring
 Uwe Spies
 Axel Sundermann
 Jens Todt
 Uwe Wassmer
 Marco Weißhaupt
 Günther Wienhold
 Tobias Willi
 Andreas Zeyer
 Ferydoon Zandi
 Cha Du-ri
 Roda Antar
 Youssef Mohamad
 Soumaila Coulibaly
 Boubacar Diarra
 Harry Decheiver
 Papiss Cissé
 Souleyman Sané
 Miran Pavlin
 Alain Sutter
 Zoubeir Baya
 Mehdi Ben Slimane
 Adel Sellimi
 Paul Caligiuri

Club staff

Head coaches
Coaches of the club since 1946:

 Andreas Munkert (1946–49)
 Arthur Mattes (1949–50)
 Andreas Munkert (1950–53) (second time) Willi Hornung (1953–55)
 Kurt Mannschott (1956–58)
 Hans Roggow (1960–63)
 Hans Faber (1963–64)
 Hans Diehl (1964–69)
 Edgar Heilbrunner (1969–72)
 Manfred Brief (1 July 1972 – 30 September 1978)
 Heinz Baas (30 Sep 1978 – 30 June 1979)
 Norbert Wagner (1 July 1979 – 24 January 1980)
 Jupp Becker (1 July 1980 – 24 January 1981)
 Horst Zick (25 Jan 1981 – 30 June 1981)
 Lutz Hangartner (1 July 1981 – 30 June 1982)
 Werner Olk (1 July 1982 – 30 June 1983)
 Fritz Fuchs (1 July 1983 – 30 June 1984)
 Antun Rudinski (1 July 1984 – 1 January 1986)
 Jupp Becker (25 Jan 1986 – 22 March 1986) (second time) Horst Zick (23 March 1986 – 30 June 1986) (second time) Jörg Berger (1 July 1986 – 17 December 1988)
 Fritz Fuchs (1 Jan 1989 – 8 April 1989) (second time) Uwe Ehret (9 April 1989 – 30 June 1989)
 Lorenz-Günther Köstner (1 July 1989 – 26 August 1989)
 Uwe Ehret (27 Aug 1989 – 26 November 1989) (second time)''
 Bernd Hoß (1 Dec 1989 – 30 June 1990)
 Eckhard Krautzun (1 July 1990 – 30 June 1991)
 Volker Finke (1 July 1991 – 20 May 2007)
 Robin Dutt (June 2007 –30 June 2011)
 Marcus Sorg (1 July 2011 – 29 December 2011)
 Christian Streich (29 Dec 2011 –)

Women's section

Recent seasons

The recent season-by-season performance of the club:

SC Freiburg

SC Freiburg II

 With the introduction of the Regionalligas in 1994 and the 3. Liga in 2008 as the new third tier, below the 2. Bundesliga, all leagues below dropped one tier. In 2012, the number of Regionalligas was increased from three to five with all Regionalliga Süd clubs except the Bavarian ones entering the new Regionalliga Südwest.

Key

Notable chairmen
 Achim Stocker † (1972–2009)

References

External links

 
SC Freiburg at Weltfussball.de 

 
Football clubs in Germany
Football clubs in Baden-Württemberg
Association football clubs established in 1904
1904 establishments in Germany
Bundesliga clubs
Sport in Freiburg im Breisgau
2. Bundesliga clubs